Thomas Estley Community College is a coeducational secondary school with academy status, located in Broughton Astley, Leicestershire, England. It caters for students aged 11–16. It forms part of The Success Academy Trust, together with Cosby Primary School, Hallbrook Primary School and Richmond Primary School.

Subjects are:
English, Science, CRE, History, Geography, French, Spanish, PE, Drama, Music, Computing, Art, Textiles, Resistant Materials, and Systems and Control. Dance, Health and Social Care, and Business are also included as a GCSE subject.

The school hosts a satellite site of Birkett House School, offering alternative education for pupils with moderate learning difficulties.

References

External links
Official website
Official Facebook profile
The Success Academy Trust
Thomas Estley Learning Alliance

Secondary schools in Leicestershire
Academies in Leicestershire
Broughton Astley